are Japanese stone statues; mostly of Ksitigarbha and other kinds of stone statues made by Buddhist monk Hōgyū (around 1672–1732) between 1722 and 1732 in Kumamoto, Japan.  When Hōgyū was about 14, in 1686, his father was killed by a samurai. Later he made stone statues for the repose of the soul of his father.

Historical records
In January 1686, a blacksmith called Hichizaemon, a heavy drinker, threw a bamboo blower at his son. It accidentally hit the forehead of a samurai, Ohyano Genzaemon. Despite repeated apologies, Genzaemon immediately killed Hichizaemon with a sword, that being legal at the time by kiri sute gomen. Genzaemon, the son and his sister all wrote witness statements, and the Bugyō did not punish Genzaemon.

Out of grief, the son entered the Buddhist priesthood for the repose of his father, and offered a prayer with a vow that he would make 100 stone statues. He made 107 stone statues between 1722 and 1732. He died in 1732. The 100th statue was in Ōjō-in Temple in Kumamoto, and it was the biggest statue ( high) among others standing on the big stone lotus.

Stone statues
Most common are standing or sitting statues of Ksitigarbha with a monk's staff in the right hand and Cintamani in the left hand. There are other types of statues, such as Amitabha, Guanyin, Avalokitesvara, Bhaisajyaguru and mixtures of these statues. Behind each statue is a boat-shaped Aureola on which is written "Tariki" ("Through the Buddha") and the sequence number of his statue such as the 100th, and the petitioner is Hōgyū.

Another opinion
Hideo Nagata studied every statue of Hōgyū and stated that the Hōgyū was not the boy whose father was killed. The statues might be connected with the circumstances of the time such as famine.

Table of Hōgyū Jizō

Poems
The following are douka, or didactic poems, of Hōgyū:

Notes

References

 
 
 
 
Incident at Kajiyacho confirmed on Mar. 14, 2012

Japanese sculpture
Stone Buddha statues
Buddha statues in Japan